Judge Pierce may refer to:

Allin H. Pierce (1897–1980), judge of the United States Tax Court
David Pierce Jr. (1786–1872), judge of the Vermont  court of common pleas
Lawrence W. Pierce (1924–2020), judge of the United States Court of Appeals for the Second Circuit
Samuel Pierce (1922–2000), judge of the New York Court of General Sessions

See also
Justice Pierce (disambiguation)